Psolidae is a family of sea cucumbers, marine animals with elongated bodies, leathery skins and tentacles that are found on the sea bed.

Description
Members of the family Psolidae are small and inconspicuous sea cucumbers found in crevices and under boulders. They have a crown of branched tentacles, calcareous plates on the skin of the trunk and a basal sole that can move across the substrate. Some genera have papillae above but these are lacking in species of the genus Psolus.

List of genera
 Ceto Gistel, 1848 -- 1 species
 Echinopsolus Gutt, 1990 -- 4 species
 Ekkentropelma Pawson, 1971 -- 2 species
 Lissothuria Verrill, 1867 -- 9 species
 Neopsolidium Pawson, 1964 -- 2 species
 Psolidium Ludwig, 1887 -- 51 species
 Psolus Jaeger, 1833 -- 55 species

References

Echinoderm families
Dendrochirotida